The Cora F. Cressey was a five masted   wooden-hulled freight schooner operating in the coasting trade along the east coast of the United States.  Built in 1902, she served in that trade until 1928.  After serving for a time as a floating nightclub, her hulk was towed to the Keene Narrows in Bremen, Maine, where it was scuttled to serve as a breakwater for a lobster operation.  Despite its deteriorating condition, the hulk is one of the largest surviving wooden hulls in the United States.  It was listed on the National Register of Historic Places in 1990.

Description
Cora F. Cressey was built in 1902 at the Percy and Small Shipyard (now the campus of the Maine Maritime Museum) in Bath, Maine. The hull was not diagonally braced, but did have iron belts  for reinforcement. She had a registered capacity of 2499 gross tons and 2089 net tons. She was fitted with two decks and had a typical crew complement of eleven. She had a small steam donkey engine for raising anchors and sails, but not propulsion.

Operational history
Cora F. Cressey was primarily engaged in transporting coal along the eastern seaboard  of the United States from southern ports to the north.  Her high bow is credited with helping her survive a gale in 1924 that caused the  Wyoming, the largest schooner ever built, to sink.  In service until 1928, she was converted for use as a floating nightclub in Boston in 1929.  Later she was towed to Gloucester, Massachusetts and Providence, Rhode Island in the same role. 

In 1938 her masts were removed and she was purchased by the owner of a lobster operation  in Bremen, Maine.  She was towed to the Keene Narrows, between the mainland and Oar Island, and partially filled with sand to serve as a lobster pound. Holes were cut in her hull in an unsuccessful bid to improve circulation, and she ended up acting as a breakwater for lobster pens set between her and the shore.  In 1988, a  section of her hull fell off.  Portions of her fixtures and equipment were removed prior to her use as a breakwater, and survive as display items at the Maine Maritime Museum.

Significance
The badly deteriorating hulk of Cora F. Cressey is one of the largest surviving wooden hulls in the United States.  Due to the structural limitations of wooden construction,  ships of this size were often leaky, and could not withstand the stresses of heavy weather and sustained hard sailing.  Although the largest had up to seven masts, sail power put them at a competitive disadvantage with steam-powered vessels, which could make passage more reliably.  There are no known surviving six- or seven-masted wooden schooner hulls.

See also

National Register of Historic Places listings in Lincoln County, Maine
Hesper and Luther Little - two other Maine schooners that were abandoned in the 1930s.

References

External links
http://www.hazegray.org/features/schooners
http://www.hazegray.org/features/schooners/schn27.jpg 1902 picture (probably out of copyright)
https://web.archive.org/web/20161012105030/http://www.panoramio.com/photo/16454035
http://www.wreckhunter.net/DataPages/corafcressy-dat.htm
http://www.pbs.org/wgbh/roadshow/archive/201104A22.html Antiques Roadshow appraisal of Cora F. Cressey painting; details; refers to NYT article
http://video.pbs.org/video/2186238764/ video

Ships on the National Register of Historic Places in Maine
1902 ships
Transportation buildings and structures in Lincoln County, Maine
Schooners of the United States
Breakwaters
National Register of Historic Places in Lincoln County, Maine
Ships sunk as breakwaters
Ships built in Bath, Maine